Gharasarapa (The Lurking Serpent) is a 2018 Sri Lankan Sinhala supernatural romantic horror film directed by Jayantha Chandrasiri and produced by Arjuna Kamalanath for Isuru Films. It stars Jackson Anthony, Kamal Addararachchi and Sangeetha Weeraratne in lead roles along with Sriyantha Mendis, Devnaka Porage and Kavindya Adikari. Music composed by Chintaka Jayakody. Kavindya Adikari, who is the daughter of popular singers Samitha Mudunkotuwa and Athula Adhikari make her debut cinema acting with the film.

The film was screened at the Tharangani Theatre at the National Film Corporation on 29 June 2018. The film was officially released on 10 August 2018. It is the 1310th Sri Lankan film in the Sinhala cinema.

Plot
In the 1980, A Sinhala boy, Sandares Edirisinghe (Devnaka Porage), and a Tamil girl, Vidya (Kavindya Adhikari), fall in love (It's love at first sight) on their way to the church at Gadagama. The girl, possessed by the Kalu Kumaraya (Jackson Anthony) (Sri Lankan folklore version of Incubus), can only be healed by Rev. Camilus Dabare (Shriyantha Mendis). Gharasarpa finds it hard to possess the girl because she has already fallen for Sandaras, proven true love can defeat the Gharasarpa (demonic possession). As Vidya has fully recovered, they leave the church after sharing postal addresses, hinting they will meet here after. In such a date in a cinema hall, Vidya informed because of the upcoming events of Sri Lankan Civil War in 80s, her family is forced to leave the country to settle in Canada. Because she is unable to leave Sandares, Vidya asked Sandaras to marry her. As he is just a 19-year-old school boy (Vidya was 18 years old by then) Sandares shows hesitation towards the marriage. Somehow Vidya left the country and settled in Canada, and few years later become a psychiatrist and married a Tamil doctor.

Kalu Kumaraya reaches Sandaras in an unexpected moment and convey the news that Vidya now is in Canada but promise Sandares, if she ever returns to the motherland he will definitely make them meet.

37 years later

Dr. Vidya Doraiappa returned Sri Lanka. As per the promise given by Kalu Kumaraya, he is in a mission to make former lovers meet. In that mission Ghrasarpa may turn Sandares's usual routine happy marriage life up side down.

Cast
 Jackson Anthony as Gharasarapa aka Kalu Kumara
 Kamal Addararachchi as Sandares Edirisinghe
 Devnaka Porage as Teenage Sandares Edirisinghe
 Sangeetha Weeraratne as Dr. Vidya Doraiappa
 Kavindya Adhikari as Teeange Vidya 
 Sriyantha Mendis as Rev.Fr. Camilus Dabare (in 1980)
 Kusum Renu as Vidya's mother (in 1980)
 Ameesha Kavindi as Frankie Edirisinghe, Sandares's wife (in 2017)
 Yashoda Wimaladharma (guest appearance)
 Wasantha Vittachchi as Vishwanadan, Vidya's father (in 1980)
 Jayanath Bodahandi
 Aishara Athukorale as Shalika
 Rajitha Hiran
 Anura Dharmasiriwardena as Jehan
 Senaka Titus

Soundtrack

References

External links
Official facebook page
“ඝරසරප” පුර්වප්‍රචාරක පටය අන්තර්ජාලයට
Gharasarapa(2018)/ඝරසරප - Official Trailer
ජයන්ත චන්ද්‍රසිරි ඝරසරප ගෙන එයි
Gharasarapa coming on August 10
Psychology or demonology: Where 'Garasarapa' lies
ඝරසර්ප මාධ්‍ය දැක්ම
කළු කුමාරයා උද්දච්ඡ පුරුෂ රත්නයක්
ඝරසරප මංගල දර්ශනය දා
කවියි මායි අදටත් හොඳ යාළුවෝ
සරඝරප හින්දා සැබෑව එළිවුණා

2010s Sinhala-language films
2018 films